CoStar Group, Inc. is a Washington, DC-based provider of information, analytics and marketing services to the commercial property industry in the United States, Canada, the United Kingdom, France, Germany, and Spain. Founded in 1987 by Andrew C. Florance, the company has grown to include online database CoStar and many online marketplaces, including Apartments.com, LoopNet, Lands of America, and BizBuySell.

History
CoStar Group was founded in 1987 by Andrew C. Florance in Washington, D.C. It was reportedly one of the first companies that digitized and aggregated property data, before the Internet was widely available.

In 1998, the company became a public company via an initial public offering on the NASDAQ, raising $22.5 million.

In 2004, CoStar Group, Inc. v. LoopNet, Inc. became a landmark case in copyright law, about the role of an Internet Service Provider (ISP) in monitoring copyrighted content posted on its servers.

In October 2009, the company acquired a building in Washington, D.C., now its headquarters, from the Mortgage Bankers Association for $41.3 million. The building had sold 2 years earlier for $79 million and the company claims it used its analytics data to know the right time to buy.

In April 2012, CoStar Group acquired online marketing site LoopNet for $860 million. With the acquisition, CoStar Group also acquired Loopnet properties BizBuySell and LandsofAmerica.com.

In April 2014, the company acquired Apartments.com for $585 million.

In May 2016, CoStar Group's European subsidiary CoStar Europe Ltd acquired German real estate business data company Thomas Daily.

In April 2015, the company acquired Apartment Finder for $170 million. In July, the company acquired Belbex, an online marketplace and information provider for commercial property based in Spain.

In February 2017, the company acquired Westside Rentals. In March, the company acquired Spanish lending information platform Belbex.

In February 2018, the company acquired ForRent.com from Dominion Enterprises for $350 million in cash and $35 million in stock. In October, the company acquired Realla.co.uk an online marketplace for commercial property based in the United Kingdom. In November, the company acquired Cozy Services for $68 million.

In February 2019, the company announced that Oxford Economics will provide the economic data and forecasts used in CoStar’s products. In June, it was announced that CoStar Group would acquire Off Campus Partners, LLC, an online marketplace for off campus student housing. In October, it was announced that CoStar Group would acquire hotel research and analytics firm STR, Inc, for $450 million.

In May 2020, CoStar announced it was acquiring online real estate platform Ten-x, formerly known as Auction.com, for $190 million. In October, CoStar Group bought Germany-based real estate data company Emporis. In November, it was announced that CoStar Group acquired Homesnap, a residential mobile application provider, for $250 million in cash.

In April 2021, it was announced that CoStar Group acquired Homes.com, a residential real estate website from Dominion Enterprises, for $156 million in cash.

In October 2021, CoStar announced it was acquiring BureauxLocaux, a commercial property digital marketplace in France.

In February 2022, CoStar Group came under criticism when American news website Business Insider reported that over 29 current and former employees claimed to have been excessively monitored and micromanaged, including with unscheduled check in video calls made by the company's IT department.  Additional criticism included reports of employees being publicly berated, and in some cased being arbitrarily fired.  The company also reportedly made efforts to take down criticism of itself on various social media platforms. The company denied the complaints, claiming that discontent came from the company's high expectations.

Business 
CoStar Group provides commercial real estate information, analytics, and online marketplaces for real estate transactions. Its research services include online services, and research for the rental home and hotel industry.

Its subsidiaries include the following:

References

External links

Real estate companies established in 1987
1987 establishments in Washington, D.C.
Companies based in Washington, D.C.
Real estate services companies of the United States
1998 initial public offerings